Softie may refer to:

 Softie (2020 film), Kenyan documentary
 Softie (2021 film), French coming-of-age film
 Soft Girl, describing a youth subculture